De'Veon Le'trell Smith (born November 8, 1994) is an American football running back for the Arlington Renegades of the XFL. He played college football at Michigan, and was signed as an undrafted free agent by the Miami Dolphins in 2017. He played for the Orlando Apollos of the Alliance of American Football (AAF) and Tampa Bay Vipers of the XFL.

Early years
Smith was born in 1994. He attended Howland High School in Warren, Ohio. He set the career rushing record for Trumbull County, Ohio, with 6,750 rushing yards at Howland High School. He was a finalist for Ohio's "Mr. Football" award.

College career
In March 2012, prior to his senior year in high school, Smith announced that he had committed to play college football for the University of Michigan. He also received collegiate offers from Bowling Green, Indiana, Ohio State, Penn State, Purdue, and West Virginia. As a freshman in 2013, Smith appeared in twelve games and had twenty-six carries for 117 yards.

As a sophomore in 2014, Smith led Michigan with 519 rushing yards on 108 carries. In the opening game of the 2014 season, Smith carried the ball eight times for 115 yards. He also scored two touchdowns and had a run of sixty-one yards. Derrick Green also rushed for 170 yards in the game, as Smith and Green became the first pair of Michigan running backs to rush for over 100 yards in the same game since 2007. 

During the 2015 season, Smith was again Michigan's leading rusher with 753 yards and six touchdowns on 180 carries.

Through the first eleven games of the 2016 season, Smith led Michigan with 750 rushing yards and ten touchdowns on 144 carries. On November 19, 2016, he rushed for a career-high 158 yards and two touchdowns against Indiana.

Professional career

Miami Dolphins
Smith signed with the Miami Dolphins as an undrafted free agent on May 5, 2017. He was waived on September 2, 2017, and was signed to the Dolphins' practice squad the next day. He was promoted to the active roster on November 18, 2017. He was waived by the Dolphins two days later and re-signed to the practice squad. He was promoted back to the active roster on November 29, 2017.

Washington Redskins
Smith signed with the Washington Redskins on August 20, 2018. On September 1, 2018, he was waived for final roster cuts before the start of the 2018 season.

Orlando Apollos
On August 17, 2018, Smith signed with the Orlando Apollos of the Alliance of American Football for the 2019 AAF season. The league ceased operations in April 2019.

Tampa Bay Vipers
Smith was drafted in the 3rd round in the 2020 XFL Draft by the Tampa Bay Vipers. He had his contract terminated when the league suspended operations on April 10, 2020.

TSL Aviators
Smith signed with the Aviators of The Spring League on October 17, 2020.

BC Lions
Smith signed with the BC Lions of the CFL on December 15, 2020. He was released on March 19, 2021.

Pittsburgh Maulers
Smith was drafted in the 2022 USFL Draft by the Pittsburgh Maulers, but was cut from the team before the season began for a violation of team rules set by head coach Kirby Wilson.

Arlington Renegades
The Arlington Renegades selected Smith in the eighth round of the 2023 XFL Supplemental Draft on January 1, 2023.

References

External links

Michigan Wolverines football bio

1994 births
Living people
American football running backs
Michigan Wolverines football players
Sportspeople from Warren, Ohio
Players of American football from Ohio
Miami Dolphins players
Washington Redskins players
Orlando Apollos players
Tampa Bay Vipers players
The Spring League players
BC Lions players
Pittsburgh Maulers (2022) players
Arlington Renegades players